The Vermont Agency of Human Services (AHS) is a Vermont executive agency (or cabinet agency). Its purpose is to develop and execute policy on human services for the U.S. state of Vermont.

AHS was created by the Vermont Legislature in 1969 to govern all human service activities of the state government. The Agency is led by the Secretary, who is appointed by the Governor with the approval of the Senate, and the Deputy Secretary who is appointed by the Secretary with the Governor's approval. In 2019, Vermont Governor Phil Scott appointed Mike Smith as the new secretary of the Agency of Human Services for the state of Vermont.

Departments 
Departments of AHS include:

Office of the Secretary
Department for Children and Families
Department of Corrections
Department of Disabilities, Aging and Independent Living
Department of Health
Department of Mental Health
Department of Vermont Health Access

References

External links 

 Official website

Human Services